Abacetus rubidicollis is a species of ground beetle in the subfamily Pterostichinae. It was described by Wiedemann in 1823.

References

rubidicollis
Beetles described in 1823